Lazarev is a Slavic masculine surname, its feminine counterpart is Lazareva, derived from the Biblical name Lazarus. Notable people with the surname include:
Aiaal Lazarev (born 1986), Kyrgyzstani freestyle wrestler.
Alexander Lazarev (born 1945), Russian conductor
Alexander Lazarev (actor) (1938–2011), Russian actor
Anna Davidovna Abamelik-Lazareva (1814–1889), Russian-Armenian translator, socialite and public figure
Anton Lazarev (born 1990), Russian ice hockey forward
 Anton Lazarev (born 1996), Russian association football defender
Antonina Lazareva (born 1941), Soviet high jumper
Elizabeth Lazareva (born 2002), Russian football forward
Igor Lazarev (born 1963), Russian football manager and a former player
Ivan Lazarev – several people
Leonid Lazarev (1937–2021), Russian photo artist and photojournalist
Mikhail Lazarev (1788–1851), Russian admiral and explorer
Nikita Lazarev (1866–1932), Russian architect
Pavel Lazarev (1970–2018), Societ and Russian ice hockey player
Pyotr Lazarev (1878–1942), Soviet physicist, biophysicist, geophysicist, and academician, see Eduard Shpolsky
Sergey Lazarev (born 1983), Russian pop singer/opera actor
Svetlana Lazareva (born 1962), Russian pop singer
Tetyana Lazareva (born 1981), Ukrainian wrestler
Vasily Lazarev (1928–1990), Soviet cosmonaut
Viktor Lazarev (1897–1976), Soviet art critic, see Annunciation of Ustyug
Vladimir Lazarev (born 1964), chess Grandmaster
Yevgeny Lazarev, several people

See also
Lazarević

Russian-language surnames